Talides is a genus of skippers in the family Hesperiidae.

Species
Talides adjuncta
Talides alternata
Talides cantra
Talides eudega
Talides hispa
Talides riosa
Talides sergestus
Talides sinois
Talides sinon

Former species
Talides striga Geyer, [1832] - transferred to Moeris striga (Geyer, [1832])

References

External links

Hesperiinae
Hesperiidae genera